Jean-Yves Jaffray (1939–2009) was a French mathematician and economist who made influential contributions in the fields of decision theory and mathematical statistics. He pioneered methods in decision theory such as linear utility theory for belief functions, bridging the gap between expected utility and the maximin rule by using subjective probability to encompass belief functions.

References

1939 births
2009 deaths
French mathematicians